The 1930–31 Chicago Black Hawks season was the team's fifth season in the NHL, and they were coming off a surprising season, in which they finished over .500 for the first time in team history, and making the playoffs after a two-year absence.  The Hawks would go on to lose to the Montreal Canadiens in the first round.  Prior to the season, Chicago would name former team captain and player-coach Dick Irvin as the head coach.  The team responded with a club record 24 wins and 51 points, and finished in second place in the American Division, and make the playoffs for the 2nd straight season.

Regular season
Chicago was led offensively once again by Johnny Gottselig, who scored a club high 20 goals and 32 points, and by Tom Cook, who was the team leader in assists with 14, and finished 2nd in team scoring with 29 points.  Frank Ingram would have a big season, scoring a career high 17 goals.

In goal, Chuck Gardiner would play in every game, and he would break the Hawks record for wins (24), shutouts (12) and GAA (1.73).  The Hawks finished with the 2nd fewest goals against in the league.

Season standings

Record vs. opponents

Schedule and results

Playoffs
The Hawks would open the playoffs in a two-game total-goals series against the Toronto Maple Leafs, and for the first time in team history, the Black Hawks won the series by a score of 4–3.  Next up was a two-game total-goals series against the New York Rangers, and Chuck Gardiner would shine by shutting New York out in both games, as the Hawks won the series by a 3–0 score and earn a berth in the Stanley Cup Finals against the Montreal Canadiens.  The Hawks would lose the first game of the best-of-five series, but then would win two in a row in overtime to take a 2–1 series lead.  Montreal would respond with a 4–2 victory in game four, and then the Canadiens would put away the Black Hawks with a 2–0 win in the fifth and deciding game, ending the Black Hawks dream of winning the championship one win short.

Chicago Black Hawks 3, Toronto Maple Leafs 2

Chicago Black Hawks 3, New York Rangers 0

Montreal Canadiens 3, Chicago Black Hawks 2

Player statistics

Scoring leaders

Goaltending

Playoff stats

Scoring leaders

Goaltending

References

SHRP Sports
The Internet Hockey Database
National Hockey League Guide & Record Book 2007

Chicago Blackhawks seasons
Chicago
Chicago